Burr Browning Baldwin (June 13, 1922 – August 20, 2007) was an American professional football player. He played college football for the UCLA Bruins, and became the school's first player to receive All-American honors. Baldwin played pro football for three years with the Los Angeles Dons of the All-America Football Conference.

Biography
Baldwin attended Bakersfield High School in Bakersfield, California. He attended college at the University of California, Los Angeles, where he played for the Bruins as an end from 1940 to 1942. In 1943, he put his education and playing career on hiatus to enter the U.S. Army during World War II. He served from  May 1943 to July 1946 and became an infantry captain in three campaigns in the European theater of operations.

After the war, he returned to UCLA, and in 1946, became the first UCLA football player to earn All-America honors. He played in two Rose Bowls for UCLA and in 1947 was drafted by the Green Bay Packers.

After college, Baldwin played professional football with the Los Angeles Dons from 1947 to 1949. He returned to military service during the Korean War from 1951 to 1953. Baldwin spent fifty years working as an insurance broker before he retired in July 2007. He died at his home in Bakersfield on August 20, 2007 of complications due to cancer. The Bob Elias Kern County Sports Hall of Fame inducted Baldwin in February 1969.

References

1922 births
2007 deaths
Players of American football from Bakersfield, California
UCLA Bruins football players
All-American college football players
Los Angeles Dons players
United States Army officers
United States Army personnel of World War II
United States Army personnel of the Korean War
Deaths from cancer in California